Edmund Samuel Currey (born 28 June 1868) was an English footballer who earned two caps for the national team in 1890, scoring two goals. Currey played club football for Oxford University.

External links

1868 births
Year of death unknown
English footballers
England international footballers
Oxford University A.F.C. players
Association football inside forwards
People from Lewes
Sportspeople from East Sussex